Dulcima is a 1971 British drama film directed by Frank Nesbitt. It was entered into the 21st Berlin International Film Festival. The story revolves around a love triangle: a farmer, his housekeeper and the handsome neighbour.

Plot
Dulcima Gaskain (Carol White) is the oldest daughter of a large, poor Gloucestershire farming family. Rescuing a drunken farmer, Mr Parker (John Mills) who has fallen and cut his head, she discovers his hat is stuffed with cash, and inveigles him to hire her as a housekeeper by voluntarily cleaning his filthy, chicken-ridden house. Her motivation is partly to escape her tyrannical father (Bernard Lee) and mother, who treat her as a skivvy and unpaid child-minder and verbally abuse her.

Parker's sexual interest in Dulcima deepens after she arrives for work in a revealing outfit. A widower, he invites her to become his live-in housekeeper. Dulcima accepts but keeps him at arm's length by creating a fictitious boyfriend, 'Albert', inspired by a male model she has seen in a magazine.
 
Showing off, Parker introduces Dulcima to his crooked dealings at the local livestock auction. As her employment continues he neglects to pay her. She however keeps a careful tally of money he owes her. The relationship becomes one of mutual deceit as well as mutual convenience.

Parker tries to spy on Dulcima as she bathes, and later invites her to join him for a beer in the parlour, but she excuses herself. Now knowing that he has a lot of cash stowed away, she begins to coquettishly encourage his increasingly lustful interest, from time to time reminding him he owes her wages, but he always deflects the demand.

Dulcima meets Ashby, a young gamekeeper who resembles 'Albert' her fantasy boyfriend (both are played by Stuart Wilson). When Parker spots Ashby rounding up pheasants which have strayed onto his farm he fears that 'Albert' is spying on him and Dulcima. She plays on this jealousy and paranoia.

To try to get Parker to pay her what she is owed she pretends to be packing to leave. Panicked at this prospect, Parker offers to pay, and she claims £40 rather than the £20 or so she is really entitled to. Parker agrees but tries to trick her with only £15. This payment is explicitly linked with her letting him sleep with her (she later takes the £25 shortfall from his secret cash tin). Thereafter there are several dialogue references to sexual favours as 'little extras' that must be paid for−. She spends money on fashionable clothes, make-up and shoes; Parker is impressed by her transformation and begins to lessen his miserliness.

Dulcima goes to visit Ashby. They are clearly interested in each other.

Parker decides to ask Dulcima to marry him but having met Ashby she asks for time to consider. In attempts to persuade her Parker buys a TV set so that they will have something to do on winters evenings when they are married, and 'reveals' the hoard of cash she already knows about.

In town, we see Parker untypically cheerful and benevolent at the market while Dulcima spots Ashby there and purposely gets the same bus home as he does. That evening, Parker has bought himself a new suit and a wedding dress for Dulcima but, distracted, she doesn't unbox it, instead telling Parker she is going out to visit her family. Suspicious, he follows her and sees her meet Ashby in a field, kiss him and head off toward his house (Parker still thinks this is "Albert"). Ashby and Dulcima go dancing. Parker gets drunk and becomes violent and abusive when she returns. She says she will leave in the morning and locks herself in her room. Parker smashes the living room furniture, including the new TV, and tears up the unwanted wedding dress, then remorsefully pleads forgiveness through her locked bedroom door. She remains silent.

In the final scene Dulcima next morning sees Ashby come into the farmyard through her bedroom window. Coming downstairs she finds both the ruined wedding dress and a wedding ring in a box. There is no sign of Parker. Joining Ashby outside, she tearfully tells him she cannot go with him as she is too worried about Parker. Before Ashby can react, Parker shoots him dead from an attic window.

Throughout the film, Duclima never calls the farmer anything other than 'Mr Parker', even after he has proposed to her.

Cast
 Carol White as Dulcima Gaskain
 John Mills as Mr. Parker
 Stuart Wilson as Ashby the gamekeeper and as the male model in a knitting pattern advertisement
 Bernard Lee as Dulcima's father
 Sheila Raynor as Dulcima's mother
 Dudley Foster as Symes, Parker's partner-in-crime at the livestock auction
 Cyril Cross as Harris

Production
The story was taken from a novella of the same name by H. E. Bates which was published in the 1954 collection The Nature of Love.

The Canadian television film Dulcima (1969) was based on the same novella, with the setting transferred to a small town in Ontario.

In 1969, Bryan Forbes was appointed head of production at EMI Films. Dulcima was announced as part of his initial slate of productions with John Mills and Frank Nesbitt attached from the beginning.

Filming
The bulk of the film was shot on location on a farm, over the summer in and around Minchinhampton and Tetbury in Gloucestershire. Shooting was plagued by rain.

Other versions
In 1982 Nica Burns adapted the show for the stage.

References

External links

Dulcima at Letterbox DVD
Dulcima at BFI
Dulcima at TCMDB

1971 films
1971 drama films
British drama films
Films shot at EMI-Elstree Studios
Films about farmers
Films about infidelity
Films based on short fiction
Films set in Gloucestershire
Films shot in Gloucestershire
Films scored by Johnny Douglas
EMI Films films
Murder in films
1970s English-language films
1970s British films